Revolutionary Socialist Youth (in French: Jeunesse Socialiste Révolutionnaire) is the youth wing of the Revolutionary Socialist Party (PSR). It published De Fonken. JSR was founded in 1978.

JSR is the continuation of Schülerfront, that existed 1971-1977.

Trotskyist organizations in Europe
Youth wings of political parties in Luxembourg